The Chien Mu House is a former house of Ch'ien Mu in Shilin District, Taipei, Taiwan. The house is located inside Soochow University and managed by the university.

History
The house was constructed after Ch'ien Mu arrived in Taiwan from British Hong Kong in 1967 after the Hong Kong leftist riots which was known as Su Shu Building. After Ch'ien Mu passed away in 1990, the Taipei City Government established the Chien Mu Memorial Library at the house on 6 January 1992. In 2000, the house underwent renovation by the city government. On 31 December 2001, In 2002, the Department of Cultural Affairs of the city government renamed the house to Chien Mu House and handed over to Soochow University for its operations. It was then handed over again to Taipei Municipal University of Education on 1 January 2011.

Transportation
The house is accessible by bus from Shilin Station of Taipei Metro.

See also
 List of tourist attractions in Taiwan

References

2002 establishments in Taiwan
Houses completed in 1967
Houses in Taiwan
Soochow University (Taiwan)
Tourist attractions in Taipei